Campbell Township may refer to:

Arkansas
 Campbell Township, Lawrence County, Arkansas, in Lawrence County, Arkansas

Indiana
 Campbell Township, Jennings County, Indiana
 Campbell Township, Warrick County, Indiana

Michigan
 Campbell Township, Michigan

Minnesota
 Campbell Township, Minnesota

Missouri
 Campbell Township, Douglas County, Missouri, in Douglas County, Missouri
 Campbell Township, Polk County, Missouri

North Dakota
 Campbell Township, Emmons County, North Dakota
 Campbell Township, Hettinger County, North Dakota, in Hettinger County, North Dakota

South Dakota
 Campbell Township, Hand County, South Dakota, in Hand County, South Dakota

Township name disambiguation pages